Richy Hughes is an English Musical Theatre lyricist and Theatre Maker from Thurrock, England.

Early life
Richy Hughes was born in 1974, and attended Coopers' Company and Coborn School in Upminster, Essex. He regularly wrote and performed end of year revues, and won the school's Prize for Art in 1992. He went on to study Illustration at the Kent Institute of Art and Design.

From an early age Hughes was an active member of the amateur dramatics scene in his home town of Thurrock, starring in numerous roles including Sidney Carton in a musical premiere of A Tale of Two Cities, Riff in West Side Story, and Billy Bigelow in Carousel.

In 1999, he founded a youth theatre company known as Arts Factory.

Career

Early career
Hughes' break into professional theatre came in 2012, when he entered a song into an open submission for A Song Cycle For Soho at the Soho Theatre. The comic song, entitled 'It's What He Would’ve Wanted', written with composer Scott Dean, tells the story of ‘Jimmy The Fox’ whose corpse is ‘borrowed’ from the undertakers on the eve of his funeral for one last bender in Soho.

In 2012, he joined the Book, Music, Lyrics professional writers’ workshop. Here he honed his lyric-writing craft under the tutelage of such esteemed theatre practitioners as Jeremy Sams, Charles Hart, Tim Sutton, David Firman, Mark Warman, George Stiles and Anthony Drewe.

2015 - Mr Popper's Penguins
Hughes' first professional commissions came after producer Kenny Wax attended a showcase of Book, Music, Lyrics alumni. Wax was impressed with Hughes' lyrics and invited him to collaborate on a new family musical adaptation of children's book, Mr Popper's Penguins. The production premiered at The Lowry in Manchester in 2015, and has had runs at the Criterion Theatre in London's West End, the New Victory Theater in New York City, and the Seattle Children's Theatre, as well as extensive US and UK tours. The show was co-produced by Pins & Needles Productions, Kenny Wax Family Entertainment, and TC Beech, with songs written in collaboration with composer Luke Bateman.

2017 - Superhero
At the Book, Music, Lyrics Workshop, Hughes met composer Joseph Finlay and bookwriter Michael Conley, his collaborators on Superhero, which premiered at Southwark Playhouse in June 2017. The song 'Don't Look Down', taken from the show won The Stiles and Drew Best New Song Prize in 2015, at an event at the Wyndham's Theatre, produced by Mercury Musical Developments and hosted by Elaine Paige. The show went on to win the Off West End Theatre Award (Offie) for best new musical in 2018. Micheal Rouse also won the Offie for Best Actor in a Musical for his portrayal of Colin Bradley in the same year.

2019 - Oi Frog and Friends
In 2019, Hughes and Pins & Needles Productions adapted Kes Gray and Jim Field's best-selling children's book series Oi Frog and Friends for the stage. This time, Hughes played a key role in the development and writing of the script with his co-collaborators Emma Earle, Zoe Squire and Luke Bateman, as well as writing lyrics. The production premiered at Frensham Heights in October 2019 before going on to a critically acclaimed run at the Lyric Theatre in the West End. In 2020, the show was nominated for the Laurence Olivier Award for Best Family Show.

Personal life
Hughes currently lives in Orsett, Essex with his wife, Nikki, and his children Jessie and Harry.

In May 2022 Hughes appeared on the fifth series of ITV game show Beat The Chasers.

Musical theatre credits
A Song Cycle For Soho (2012) - lyrics
Mercury Musical Developments 25th Anniversary Gala (2013) - lyrics
Mr Popper's Penguins (2015) - lyrics
Superhero (2017) - lyrics
 Oi Frog and Friends (2019) - lyrics & script

Awards and nominations

References

External links
 Richy Hughes Official Website
 Book Music and Lyrics Workshop

1974 births
Living people
People from Essex
People from Thurrock
People from Orsett
English musical theatre lyricists